Ride Like the Wind is an album by jazz musician Freddie Hubbard recorded direct to two-track digital and released on the Elektra/Musician label.

Track listing
 "Hubbard's Cupboard" (Allyn Ferguson) - 4:54
 "This Is It" (Kenny Loggins, Michael McDonald) - 4:35
 "Condition Alpha" (Allyn Ferguson) - 4:52
 "Ride Like the Wind" (Christopher Cross) - 4:54
 "Birdland" (Joe Zawinul) - 6:21
 "Bridgitte" (Hubbard) - 6:13
 "Two Moods for Freddie" (Allyn Ferguson) - 5:23

Personnel
 Freddie Hubbard - trumpet, flugelhorn
 Bill Maxwell - drums
 Joe Porcaro - percussion
 Abe Laboriel - bass
 Bill Mays - keyboards
 Dan Ferguson - guitars
 Plus string orchestra and big band conducted and arranged by Allyn Ferguson
 Bud Shank - alto saxophone, flute
 Bill Perkins - tenor saxophone
 Bob Tricarico - baritone saxophone
 Chuck Findley - lead trumpet, flugelhorn
 Gary Grant - trumpet, flugelhorn
 Bill Watrous - trombone
 Vincent DeRosa - French horn
 Tommy Johnson - tuba

Chart performance

References

1982 albums
Freddie Hubbard albums
Albums arranged by Allyn Ferguson
Elektra/Musician albums